The Hanriot H.110 was an unusual pusher configuration, twin boom, single seat fighter aircraft built in France in the early 1930s.  It proved to be slower and less manoeuvrable than its contemporaries and failed to reach production, even as the Hanriot H.115 after receiving a more powerful engine and cannon armament.

Design and development

From 1916 until 1933, the only Hanriot fighter aircraft had been tractor biplanes.  The Hanriot H.110, a twin boom pusher cantilever monoplane was therefore a considerable departure from the past. It was designed to compete in the STAé (Service Technique de l'Aéronautique or Technical Section of Aeronautics) 1930/31 C1 (single seat Chasseur of fighter) programme.

The all-metal H.110 had an open cockpit and engine in a short central nacelle.  It was powered by a  Hispano-Suiza 12Xbrs supercharged upright water-cooled V-12 engine behind the pilot, driving a three-blade pusher propeller. The pilot's headrest was smoothly faired into the engine cowling. There was a circular Chausson radiator in the short nose ahead of the open cockpit, with a variable position central cone to control the airflow.

The wings were built around two spars. The central 25% of their span, between the booms, had constant chord.  Immediately outboard they had a wider chord and beyond were double straight tapered to rounded tips. They carried  almost full-span, narrow-chord Frise ailerons. Forward, the slim, square section and untapered tail booms blended into the wings at about mid-chord, the aft ends carrying a constant-chord tailplane slightly above them. This had rounded tips and a central elevator with a trim tab. A central, single, tall, round-tipped, wire-braced vertical tail was mounted on in it. The H.110 had a fixed, split, conventional undercarriage with each spatted mainwheel on a faired, near vertical shock absorber and a rearward leaning strut together forming a V, laterally braced with an inverted V-strut attached near the under-fuselage centre line.  There was a central tailwheel on a long leg under the fin.

The H.110 began flight testing in April 1933. Tested against its smaller and lighter competitors, it proved slower and less manoeuvrable and was returned to Hanriot for modification. A  APX cannon was now housed in a fairing below the nacelle as an alternative to the earlier pair of Chatellerault  machine guns. After more modifications over the winter of 1934-5 it returned to Villacoublay in June 1935 and was officially flight tested until mid August, but failed to attract a contract.

Variants
H.110Original version.
H.115 Uprated engine, shorter nose, four blade propeller and  cannon.

Specifications (H.110)

References

Single-engined pusher aircraft
Twin-boom aircraft
1930s French fighter aircraft
H.110